Kind Lady is a 1951 American film noir crime film directed by John Sturges. It stars Ethel Barrymore, Maurice Evans, Keenan Wynn and Angela Lansbury.

The film is remake of the 1935 film of the same name, which starred Aline MacMahon in the title role.

Plot
A seemingly kind painter, Henry Elcott, tricks wealthy art collector Mary Herries into letting him, his wife Ada and their baby live in her London home. Ada has collapsed and a doctor claims it is best she not be moved. It turns out to be a diabolical scheme by Elcott to sell off the artwork of Mrs. Herries and everything else of value she owns while holding her and her housemaid Rose captive in their bedrooms. Elcott's accomplices, Mr. and Mrs. Edwards, take over as the butler and maid. Elcott masquerades as the lady's nephew, come to take care of her affairs due to a sudden mental breakdown.

The criminals taunt Mrs. Herries, placing her chair near a window, having informed the neighborhood that any screams they hear would be those of a woman who has gone mad. In no hurry to leave, Elcott goes so far as to paint a portrait of her. Mrs. Edwards gets anxious that they are staying too long in the house, which Elcott intends to sell. Mrs. Herries tries to bribe her, but the brutal Mr. Edwards snatches the money from his wife and refuses to leave. Tensions rise as Mrs. Herries learns the true identity of Elcott from a portrait of his wife that he signed with his real name. Ada has seen Elcott kill before and realizes he will again. She tries to free Rose, but the maid is murdered by Mr. Edwards. The time comes to pack up and leave. Mr. Edwards goes upstairs to push Mrs. Herries out the window, an apparent suicide. But the body in the chair has been switched by Mrs. Herries and Ada and is actually that of Rose. The police are on their way and Elcott realizes that he and Mr. and Mrs. Edwards have made a fatal mistake.

Cast
 Ethel Barrymore as Mary Herries 
 Maurice Evans as Henry Springer Elcott 
 Angela Lansbury as Mrs. Edwards 
 Keenan Wynn as Edwards, the Butler 
 Betsy Blair as Ada Elcott 
 John Williams as Mr. Foster 
 Doris Lloyd as Rose 
 Moyna Macgill as Mrs. Harkley, Rose's sister
 Barry Bernard as Mr. Harkley
 Patrick O'Moore as Constable Orkin

Reception
According to MGM records, the film made $361,000 in the U.S. and Canada and $139,000 in other markets, resulting in a loss to the studio of $664,000.

References

External links
 
  
 
 

1951 films
American crime drama films
Remakes of American films
Films scored by David Raksin
Films about con artists
Films directed by John Sturges
Films set in London
Metro-Goldwyn-Mayer films
1951 crime drama films
American black-and-white films
1950s English-language films
1950s American films